Revo, (Retail Evolution), previously the British Council of Shopping Centres (BCSC) is a non-profit professional body and membership organisation in the United Kingdom serving the retail property and placemaking industry.

Overview
Revo represents the interests of its members, sets standards and brings people together to collaborate and create tangible changes in the retail property market.

Its aim is to foster a professional, socially responsible and progressive retail property industry while enhancing members' commercial advantage through events, award and education programmes, research publications and influencing local and national government policy.

The organisation was founded in 1983, and it is headquartered in London. Its Chief Executive is Vivienne King.

References

Business organisations based in the United Kingdom
1983 establishments in the United Kingdom
Business organisations based in London
Organisations based in the City of Westminster
Organizations established in 1983
Shopping centres in the United Kingdom